Humanitarianism in raelian literature is a collection of economic ideas which, according to its creator Raël, is designed to complement Geniocracy.

Name
There is no official name for the economic ideas, but it is one of the names initially suggested by the Elohim according to the book Intelligent Design: Message from the Designers, and is the defacto name of the ideology onwards.

Relation with capitalism

Humanitarianism accepts the capitalist notion that through competition and technological innovation, some companies may install automation in an attempt to reduce costs, which replaces jobs and reduces the aggregate consumer base.  As long as there are industries which have not reached maturity, the employment will return to a natural level, as will the consumer base.  In the framework of Humanitarianism, capitalism is considered to be the best way for industries to mature in the long run.

In place once maturity of all industries is close at hand, automation is seen to eliminate jobs at a rate faster than new industries can introduce.  If the economic system is not reformed around this time, this not only reduces aggregate consumer base, but also the total consumer base, resulting in poverty despite normal levels of output.  Reflecting on history, the author of Humanitarianism, Claude Vorilhon, suggested that all employees whose labor was replaced by automation should have received supplemental income and that all individuals should receive minimal existence revenue (their fair share of what automation has to offer). Humanitarianism supports the implementation of a basic income.

In Claude Vorilhon's book Geniocracy, he writes:
Obviously this system is not viable in a capitalist society, since once the owners automate their factories, they just sack all their workers without pay and let them starve while the machines do all the work, filling their own pockets with gold from the profit. This is unjust and should not be tolerated. The boss who builds a machine that replaces one hundred workers should continue to pay these workers who now have nothing to do. Thus the machine should allow them to enter and benefit from the age of leisure.

People often say that machines enslave man and that technology dehumanises society, but they are wrong! It is the manufacturer that enslaves man. It is to the manufacturer that man is condemned to a life sentence of forced labour. The manufacturer enslaves man, but robots free us. The only reason that technology is dehumanising society is because humans still have to work with the machines used for forced labour, or because they must clock in to where the forced labour takes place. That is the problem, humans and machines should not be mixed together. Humans are designed to spend their time in places of fulfilment, while machines are designed to function in the workplace, under the supervision of robots and computers.

In book 1 of 3 in Claude Vorilhon's Intelligent Design was a text allegedly narrated by Yahweh, who according to him, is a humanoid extraterrestrial responsible for the creation of life on earth:

YOU could very soon live in a genuine terrestrial paradise if only the technology that you have at your disposal today were made to serve human well-being, instead of serving violence, armies, or the personal profit of a few.

Science and technology can totally liberate humanity not only from the problem of hunger in the world, but also from the obligation to work to live, since machines can quite easily look after the daily chores by themselves thanks to automation.

Economic rent

One way to aid such an effort, Raelians believe, is by changing how property is exploited.  According to the Raelian Messages, the following was another official message from Yahweh:

You are all born equal and this is also written in the Bible. Your governments should ensure that people are born with approximately the same level of financial means. It is unacceptable that  unintelligent children should live in luxury thanks to the fortunes amassed by their parents, while geniuses die of hunger and do any menial chore just to eat.
This way they forsake occupations where they could have made discoveries benefiting the whole of humanity. To avoid this, property ownership must be abolished without establishing Communism.

Under most capitalistic systems, money is created by issuing debt and is not necessarily introduced at birth.  Instead of property ownership, the humanitarianism described in the Raelian Messages involves of long-duration rent(an idea held by many proponents of Georgism).  In the Raelian idea of humanitarianism, this should even apply in the case of businesses (as well as land):

Thus individuals can make a fortune for themselves depending on their own merits, but not for their children. To each their own merits. The same should apply to commercial and industrial enterprises.
If someone creates a business, it is theirs for their entire life, and they can rent it out, but never for more than forty-nine years. The same goes for farmers. They can rent land and cultivate it for forty-nine years but after that it all goes back to the State which will be able to rent it out again for another forty-nine years. Their children can also rent it for forty-nine years.
This method must be adopted for all goods that remain exploitable...

Under Humanitarianism, the only legal inheritance is the family home.

See also
Automation
Capitalism
Microcredit
Netocracy
Socialism
Trade credit
Technological singularity
Antiwork

References

Rael, Geniocracy. The Raelian Foundation, 2004.
Rael, Intelligent Design: Message from the Designers. Nova Dist., 2006. . - The messages given to Rael published in 1973, 1975, and 1979.

External links
 http://marshallbrain.com/robotic-nation.htm - Robotic Nation series by Marshall Brain of HowStuffWorks.com

Schools of economic thought
Raëlian practices